The Last Women Standing is a 2015 romantic drama film directed by Luo Luo, in her directorial debut. A China-Hong Kong co-production, the film was based on a novel written by Luo Luo. translated in Malay by Megan Tay (when she's writing in Malaysia.) and It released in China on November 6, 2015.

Plot
Adapted from the book of the same name, The Last Woman Standing is a romantic film featuring Shu Qi and Eddie Peng. It tells the story of a successful business woman who has long desired to find love and has finally met the one.

Cast
Shu Qi as Sheng Ruxi
Eddie Peng as Ma Sai
Pan Hong as Sheng's mom
Chin Shih-chieh as Sheng's dad
Xing Jiadong as Doctor Bai
Hao Lei as Wang Lan
Lynn Hung as Zhang Yu

Reception
The film earned  on its opening weekend at the Chinese box office.

References

2015 romantic drama films
Chinese romantic drama films
2015 directorial debut films
2015 films
Films based on Chinese novels
Hong Kong romantic drama films
2010s Hong Kong films